The Massachusetts School of Law (MSLAW) is a private law school in Andover, Massachusetts. It was founded in 1988 and claims that its design and curriculum were influenced by the medical school educational model and legal scholars. Although it is accredited by the New England Commission of Higher Education, it is not accredited by the American Bar Association (ABA).

The MSLAW bar passage rate for July 2019 first-time takers was 47%, compared to an average 81% from all Massachusetts law schools.

Unlike law schools accredited by the ABA, MSLAW does not report employment outcomes for its graduates. MSLAW also does not consider LSAT scores in its admission process.

Accreditation
The Massachusetts School of Law is accredited by the New England Commission of Higher Education. It is currently unaccredited by the American Bar Association.  

In 1990, the Massachusetts Board of Regents of Higher Education authorized MSL to grant the Juris Doctor degree. MSLAW subsequently applied for American Bar Association approval while filing an action in Federal Court in Philadelphia challenging some of the ABA's accreditation standards, arguing that those standards are of questionable educational value, violate antitrust laws, and needlessly increase tuition costs. MSLAW refused to comply with these standards, and the ABA refused to approve the school. As a result of its actions the MSLAW and the Department of Justice filed complaints against the ABA for antitrust violations. The summary judgment dismissing the MSLAW complaint on immunity grounds was granted to the ABA on the trial level and the United States Court of Appeals for the Third Circuit affirmed in 107 F.3d 1026. The case brought by DOJ was later settled by way of a consent decree between the ABA and the United States Department of Justice in which the ABA agreed to modify its accreditation process and eliminate some of its law school accreditation standards that violated antitrust laws and were outdated. The school continues to criticize ABA standards that it fails to meet, and encourage the Department of Education to strip the ABA of its authority over other law schools.

Admission and academics
Students at Massachusetts School of Law learn to practice law through classroom instruction, simulated client experiences, and numerous live client experiences. MSLAW does not require the LSAT for admission. However, MSLAW administers its own examination (MSLAT) similar to the LSAT, requires letters of recommendation, and interviews every applicant for admission.

Post-graduation employment prospects
Unlike ABA-accredited law schools, MSLAW does not publish employment statistics for its graduates.

When asked about the employment outcomes of MSLAW graduates in 2012, Dean Lawrence Velvel said, "I have no idea. We have never collected statistics on any of that, so we don't have any notion."

Costs
Tuition for full-time students at MSLAW for the 2020-2021 academic year is $23,850.

Notable alumni
 Steven A. Baddour, (1996), Massachusetts State Senator (2002 - 2012)
 Kim Driscoll, 73rd Lt. Governor of Massachusetts and 50th Mayor of Salem, Massachusetts
 William M. Gannon, New Hampshire State Senator (2016 - present), New Hampshire State Representative (2014 - 2016).
 Barry Finegold, Massachusetts State Senator
 Eugene L. O'Flaherty, member of the Massachusetts House of Representatives (1996 - 2013), appointed to the role of Corporation Counsel for the City of Boston in January 2014.

References

 Barron's Guide To Law Schools, 16th edition.

External links
 Official website

Buildings and structures in Andover, Massachusetts
Law schools in Massachusetts
Educational institutions established in 1988
Universities and colleges in Essex County, Massachusetts
Independent law schools in the United States
Private universities and colleges in Massachusetts
1988 establishments in Massachusetts